John Michael Schweder (May 31, 1949 – January 15, 2021) was a Democratic member of the Pennsylvania House of Representatives.

References

Democratic Party members of the Pennsylvania House of Representatives
1949 births
2021 deaths